Rajagiri Hospital is a multi-specialty tertiary care hospital in the south Indian city of Kochi, Kerala.  Established in 2014, it is owned and managed by Rajagiri (CMI) group of institutions. It is one of the few hospitals in the country with both JCI and NABH accreditation.

Rajagiri Healthcare and Education Project is a joint initiative of CMI Sacred Heart Province, together with two of its prominent units, St. Antony's Monastery, Aluva and Sacred Heart Monastery, Thevara.

Overview 

Rajagiri Hospital, established in 2014 was a thoughtful initiative from the renowned Rajagiri (CMI) group of institutions to offer quality and affordable medical care to the common man. The legacy of Rajagiri in pioneering a distinctive culture in the educational sector has helped them carve an exemplary medical institution in Kerala. The 500 bedded hospital is well laid out in a 40-acre green landscape in the serene setting of Chunangamvely, Aluva and is the closest facility to the Cochin International Airport.

Facilities 
The core facilities at the hospital include Liver transplantation, Kidney Transplantation,Bone Marrow Transplantation general medicine, spinal surgery, hepatobiliary, pancreato (Gl) surgery, dermatology, plastics-microvascular and cosmetic surgery, pathology, pediatric surgery, rheumatology, adolescent medicine, endocrinology, ENT, physical medicine, thoracic surgery, gerontology, dental surgery with specialties, hematology, ophthalmology and interventional radiology.

Radiology services are housed in a 5000 square feet wing with 3.0-tesla MRI unit, 128-slice CT scan, mammography, digital fluoroscopy and radiographic units, OPG, bone densitometry, TV and TEE imaging, high-end colour doppler ultrasound scanner with endovascular surgery and digital catheterisation laboratories.

References 

Hospitals in Kochi
2014 establishments in Kerala
Hospitals established in 2014